Erhard Mahlknecht was an Italian luger who competed in from the late 1980s to the mid-1990s. A natural track luger, he won a bronze in the singles event at the 1996 FIL World Luge Natural Track Championships in Oberperfuss, Austria.

Mahlknecht also won two men's singles medals at the FIL European Luge Natural Track Championships with a silver in 1991 and a bronze in 1987.

References
Natural track European Championships results 1970-2006.
Natural track World Championships results: 1979-2007

Italian lugers
Italian male lugers
Living people
People from Völs am Schlern
1966 births
Sportspeople from Südtirol